The Inkigayo Chart is a music program record chart on Seoul Broadcasting System (SBS) that gives an award to the best-performing single of the week in South Korea. The chart measured digital performance in domestic online music services (55%), social media via YouTube views (35%), network on-air time (10%), advanced viewer votes (5%), and album sales (5%) in its ranking methodology throughout January 2019. Beginning on February 3, Inkigayo implemented modifications for its measurements of albums (up to 10%) and social media (down to 30%).

In 2019, 36 singles ranked number one on the chart and 28 music acts received award trophies for this feat. Four songs collected trophies for three weeks and earned a Triple Crown: Itzy's "Dalla Dalla", BTS's "Boy with Luv", IU's "Blueming", and Mamamoo's "Hip". Chungha's "Gotta Go", Woody's "Fire Up", Chen's "Beautiful Goodbye", and Kim Na-young's "To Be Honest" claimed the soloists their first wins on the program. Likewise, N.Flying's "Rooftop", X1's "Flash", NU'EST's "Love Me", and Oh My Girl's "Bungee" earned the idol groups their first respective Inkigayo trophies.

BTS accumulated a perfect score on the April 28 broadcast of Inkigayo with "Boy with Luv" when the song scored 11,000 points. Oh My Girl won their first music award on a public broadcasting network with "Bungee" on SBS. It marked the record among girl groups for the longest span between their debut and the achievement at 1,581 days. In attaining their third win with "Hip", Mamamoo collected their second Triple Crown on the television series. They previously accomplished the distinction the previous year with "Starry Night".

Chart history

References 

2019 in South Korean music
2019 record charts
Lists of number-one songs in South Korea